Lucien (band) were a "Hellrock" band from Stockholm, Sweden with one member from Clevedon, UK.

History 2004–2006 
Taking the name from a character in the Sandman novels by Neil Gaiman, the band was formed in 2004 after vocalist/guitarist Greg Hell (Greg C. Pearson) left the punk band Mr.zippy (on UK's Golf Records) and moved to Stockholm, Sweden. He met guitarist Vic Hemgren (formerly of such bands as Construcdead, Maze Of Torment, Sorg and Månegarm). Later to join the band was Drummer "S.S" and bassist Ekwe Nordin. The band quickly established a sound based in the veins of punk bands such as Black Flag and The Misfits but employing a lot of the current Scandinavian rock sounds of bands such as The Hellacopters and Gluecifer. Combined with an anti-commercial and anti-authoritative attitude based in underground punk and death metal and a dark edge which was inspired by the love of such bands as Danzig and The Doors.

The band released 2 demo CD recordings, "Unholy Lords Of Rock" and "Blood Red Diary" (also released on cassette for the sake of old school). A four-track EP "D.I.Y Eller Dö" (D.I.Y Or Die) was released on a number of small underground labels worldwide in such places as Finland, Sweden, Austria, Portugal, Spain, Australia, USA and more mostly on CDR and cassette.

The band played a number of shows around Sweden and supported such bands as The Robots and Fabulous Disaster.

In 2006, bassist Ewke Nodin left the band and was replaced for a short time by Cloffe Caspersson, also from Maze Of Torment but better known as a DJ for Stockholm's 106.7 FM Rockklassiker.

In the summer of 2006 the band toured the UK.

2007–2009 

In 2007 the band was picked up by Irish label Deadlamb Records to release their self-titled debut album, this was later picked up by Sweden's Plugged Records.

Cloffe, although a good band friend didn't fit quite in and exited the band. He is listed as the band's bassist on their album and pictured although he did not play on the album and was technically only in the band for just over a week. He was replaced by the 22-year-old Johan "Täz" Lagercrantz on bass who was spotted fronting his own band Ohwebe.

The Split 

In August 2009 Lucien played their last few shows in Stockholm and one festival in Södertälje. Although all members were and still are good friends they decided to call it a day instead of keeping on trying to make it "big" when it was obvious that was never the goal of the band in the first place.

Band overview 

Lucien played what has been described as "crusty, goth tinged punk-metal (Gravyzine)" or "Dirty garage rock with enough flair to make any stadium cock-rockers cower in embarrassment (Siczine)"  and were hailed as one of the burning torches of Sweden's hardrock scene amongst what they called "a rising invasion of sleazerock imitators and radio friendly trash".

Although based very much in the ethics of punk and death metal the band's music bordered on almost commercial rock at times. This has led to many confused reviews.

The band were vocal about their love of music and the rock scene wishing to help it thrive by speaking out against its commercialism and "faceless monsters" such as unfair gigs (flyer deals, ticket deals, vote-for-me etc.) and spreading the word to "not immitiate the old masters but seek what they sought".

Discography

Demos/EPs/Albums/DVDs

References

External links 
 http://www.myspace.com/lucien Official Myspace
 http://cdon.eu/music/lucien/lucien-910467 Lucien at CDON
 http://www.gravyzine.com/Lucien.html Interview at Gravyzine
 http://www.glitzine.net/intervjuer/lucien_interview.htm interview at Glitzine

Musical groups established in 2004